The Experience of God: Being, Consciousness, Bliss is a 2013 book by philosopher and religious studies scholar David Bentley Hart published by Yale University Press. The book lays out a statement and defense of classical theism and attempts to provide an explanation of how the word "God" functions in the theistic faiths, drawing particularly from Christianity, Islam and Hinduism.

Reception
Paul J. Griffiths praised the book for "bringing together Sanskritic analyses of God's being with Latin and Greek and Arabic ones," and Rowan Williams described the book as a "masterpiece of quiet intellectual and spiritual passion" that "magnificently sets the record straight as to what sort of God Christians believe in and why."

The book was given a positive review by Oliver Burkeman in The Guardian, who called it "the one theology book all atheists really should read." Writing in The Week, Damon Linkler, gave the book a positive review, calling it "stunning." Francesca Aran Murphy, writing in First Things claimed that "The ­Experience of God is a first step toward bringing God back into the public square."

As of January 30, 2023, there were 28,666 views on the January 18, 2014 discussion posted to YouTube between Hart and atheist philosopher Richard Norman about Hart's book The Experience of God.

Philip McCosker, writing in The Tablet, gave the book a mixed review. He praised Hart's writing style, calling it "by turns elegant, curmudgeonly, witty, infuriating, incisive, nostalgic, rhapsodical, explosive, frequently bang on the money – and always stimulating," but criticized what he saw as Hart's reliance on "pompous put-down in place of argument." He also questioned the book's suitability for general readers.

See also

References

2021 non-fiction books
Religious philosophical literature
Christian theology books
Books about Hinduism
Islamic philosophical texts